What's On was an Australian television program, which aired in Melbourne on station HSV-7. The short-lived weekly program aired on Wednesdays from 29 July 1959 to 14 October 1959, and was hosted by Jean Battersby. Each episode was about 13 minutes long. According to TV listings in The Age newspaper, the program presented a round-up of stage and film entertainment in the Melbourne area.

The archival status of the program is unknown.

References

External links
What's On at IMDb

Seven Network original programming
1959 Australian television series debuts
1959 Australian television series endings
Australian non-fiction television series
English-language television shows
Black-and-white Australian television shows